The 2 øre coin was made during the German occupation of Denmark between 1941 and 1945, and then by the Danish government in 1947. It was first minted in aluminum, and then from 1942 to 1947 in zinc. The aluminum 2 øre is identical to the zinc variety, although the latter is a little heavier in weight.

Mintage
1941 aluminum

1942-1947 zinc

Gallery

References 

Denmark in World War II
Modern obsolete currencies
Coins of Denmark
Zinc and aluminum coins minted in Germany and occupied territories during World War II
Two-cent coins